Victoria Stadium is a multi-use stadium in Vânju Mare, Mehedinți County. It was the home ground of Building Vânju Mare.

Currently Minerul Valea Copcii plays on it, because its own stadium in Valea Copcii doesn't meet the requirements.

Football venues in Romania
Buildings and structures in Mehedinți County